The Circle Cross Ranch Headquarters, in Otero County, New Mexico, near Sacramento, New Mexico, was partly built in 1906.  It was listed on the National Register of Historic Places in 1980.  It has also been known as the Oliver M. Lee House and Ranch.

The main house is a one-and-a-half-story  house, built upon a raised, poured concrete basement, and is surrounded by a wood-frame veranda.  It has a hipped roof broken by two dormers on each side and by four chimneys.  The main floor, which has a board-and-batten exterior, served as living quarters.  The basement level, which is at grade on three sides, has two kitchens, a mess hall, and an office, and served as the ranch headquarters for Lee.

Also on the property are a historic  wooden barn, a log barn, and a blacksmith shop.  The log barn, built in 1905, served at first as the residence for the Lee family.

References

Ranches in New Mexico
National Register of Historic Places in Otero County, New Mexico
Buildings and structures completed in 1906
1906 establishments in New Mexico Territory